Harry S. Stout is an American historian of religion, who is currently the Jonathan Edwards Professor of American Christianity at Yale Divinity School.  He is the editor of the 27 volume series The Works of Jonathan Edwards and the co-editor with Jon Butler of the 17-volume Religion and American Life series, which is aimed at high school students.  He is the recipient of a National Endowment for the Humanities Research Fellowship and a  Guggenheim Foundation Fellowship.

Stout received a B.A. from Calvin College, and an M.A. and Ph.D. from Kent State University.

Works 
Author
(1986) The New England Soul, Preaching and Religious Culture in Colonial New England. New York: Oxford University Press. 
finalist: Pulitzer Prize for History
(1991) The Divine Dramatist: George Whitefield and the Rise of Modern Evangelicalism. Grand Rapids, Michigan: William B. Eerdmans. 
Critic’s Award for History 1991
nomination: Pulitzer Prize for Biography
(2006) Upon the Altar of the Nation: A Moral History of the Civil War. New York: Viking Books. {finalist: {Isbn|978-0-67-003470-3}}
winner: Christianity Today Best History Book 2007
winner: Philip Schaff Prize for Best Book on the History of Christianity 2006-7
winner: New England Historical Association Best Book Award 2007
finalist: Lincoln Prize
(2017) American Aristocrats: A Family, a Fortune, and the Making of American Capitalism. New York: Basic Books. 

Collaborations
with Deborah H. Deford (1987) An Enemy Among Them.  Boston: Clarion Books. 

Contributor
et al. (2005) Jonathan Edwards at 300: Essays on the Tercentenary of His Birth. Lanham, Maryland: University Press of America. 

Editor
(2017) The Jonathan Edwards Encyclopedia (27 volumes). Grand Rapids, Michigan: Eerdmans 

Co-editor
co-editor with Nathan O. Hatch (1988) Jonathan Edwards and the American Experience. New York: Oxford University Press. 
co-editor with Daniel G. Reid, Robert D. Linder, and Bruce L. Shelley (1990) Dictionary of Christianity in America. Westmont, Illinois: Intervarsity Press. 
Christianity Today Book of the Year Award 1990
co-editor with Barbara B. Oberg (1993) Benjamin Franklin, Jonathan Edwards, and The Representation of American Culture. New York: Oxford University Press. 
co-editor with John F. Smith and Kenneth P. Minkema (1995) A Jonathan Edwards Reader. New Haven: Yale University Press. 
co-editor with D. G. Hart (1997) New Directions in American Religious History. New York: Oxford University Press. 
co-editor with Jon Butler (1997) Religion in American History: A Reader. New York: Oxford University Press. 
co-editor with Randall M. Miller and Charles Reagan Wilson (1998) Religion and the American Civil War. New York: Oxford University Press.

References

Year of birth missing (living people)
Living people
Yale University faculty
American historians of religion
Kent State University alumni